The European Centre of Excellence for Civilian Crisis Management e.V. (CoE) is based in Berlin. Its task is to enhance civilian crisis management within the framework of the EU Common Security and Defence Policy (CSDP). It is a service provider for its 22 members, the European External Action Service (EEAS) as well as civilian crisis management missions. Currently it has a staff of 20, among them Senior Advisors from Finland, Lithuania, the Netherlands and Sweden.

History 
The CoE was founded in February 2020 by 14 EU Member States who followed an initiative by Germany’s Federal Foreign Office. They were later joined by further seven states, who are also EU Members.

The CoE operates with a focus on EU crisis management missions, which are key instruments of the EU Common Security and Defence Policy (CSDP). Four key priorities for Civilian CSDP missions have been identified within the Feira EU Council Conclusions from 2000: policing, rule of law, support to civil administration and civil protection. With the launch of the EU Global Strategy for Foreign and Security Policy in 2016, the priorities were revisited to focus on enhanced cooperation between EU Member States, speeding up deployment, and providing adequate EU-wide training. These priorities have been adapted to the EU’s current geopolitical environment, placing an emphasis on the internal-external security nexus, and are reflected in the adoption of the Civilian CSDP Compact of 2018. The Compact comprises 22 commitments by Member States to make civilian CSDP missions more capable, more effective, flexible, and responsive, as well as more joined up with other EU Foreign Policy tools. The Civilian CSDP Compact serves as a strategic guidance for the CoE in fulfilling its task.

The official opening ceremony of the Centre took place at the German Ministry of Foreign Affairs during Germany’s Presidency of the Council of the European Union. Ahead of the official opening event German Federal Foreign Minister Heiko Maas visited the Centre for the ribbon cutting and the inauguration of the CoE premises.

The opening event also took stock of a virtual workshop organised by the CoE on 16 September 2020. The subject of the workshop was How to improve women’s participation in civilian crisis management missions.

Priorities 
The CoE is a knowledge- and action-hub. It operates through identifying good practices in the field of civilian crisis management and augmenting them with its own analysis. The CoE offers its members tailored advice, expert support and facilitates knowledge exchange to support their effective Compact fulfilment. All content that the CoE produces is made available to its members, the EEAS and the missions through a Knowledge Hub - a platform for interaction as well as the comprehensive collection of data, information, and knowledge on civilian crisis management.

The CoE and its members have identified eleven priorities that it will be focusing on: 
 National Systems and Frameworks of Secondment
 Training Alignment and Leadership Training
 National Career Path Development
 Gender Mainstreaming and Increasing Women’s Participation in Civilian Crisis Management
 Strategic Communications
 Strategic Context of Civilian CSDP – JHA Cooperation
 Civil-Military Cooperation / Selected Mini-Concepts
 Technology and Research, Development, Innovation
 Capability Development Third Countries  
 Climate and Security
These have been developed and prioritised in the context of broader discussions on the role of Civilian CSDP in EU Foreign and Security Policy, with a focus on the integrated approach as well as the Strategic Compass. This document defines and analyses key threats and challenges to further determine the direction of the European CSDP. It was adopted in 2022 under the French EU Council Presidency.

Structure and Staff 
The European Centre of Excellence for Civilian Crisis Management (CoE) e.V. is constituted as a non-profit private association under German law. It is mainly financed by the German Federal Foreign Office and receives additional membership fees.

The team of the CoE consists of permanent staff, Senior Advisors and Founding Director Dr. Volker Jacoby, who serves as the executive board of the CoE since February 2020. The Senior Advisors, sent to the CoE by their governments (i.e. CoE members), work alongside the permanent staff in the Centre in Berlin for a determined period of time. The CoE seeks further secondment from its members to fulfil its manifold tasks.

Membership 
Membership to the CoE is restricted to EU Member States and NATO Allies. The General Meeting decides unanimously on admissions. The CoE’s “Preferred Partners” are the EEAS and NATO, represented by its International Staff (IS).

References

External links section 
 CoE Website
 European External Action Service
 CSDP Fact Sheets on the European Union 
 CSDP Federal Foreign Office
 Startseite | ZIF Berlin

Civilian missions involving the European Union